The second Baltimore Bays were a soccer team based in Baltimore, Maryland that played in the American Soccer League. They were called the Baltimore Stars in 1972.

Year-by-year

References

Defunct soccer clubs in Maryland
American Soccer League (1933–1983) teams
Baltimore Bays
Soccer clubs in Maryland
1972 establishments in Maryland
1973 disestablishments in Maryland
Association football clubs established in 1972
Association football clubs disestablished in 1973

it:Baltimore Bays#Baltimore Bays 1972-1973